The 1942 Davidson Wildcats football team was an American football team that represented Davidson College during the 1942 college football season as a member of the Southern Conference. In their seventh year under head coach Gene McEver, the team compiled an overall record of 2–6–1, with a mark of 2–4–1 in conference play, and finished in 10th place in the SoCon.

Schedule

References

Davidson
Davidson Wildcats football seasons
Davidson Wildcats football